Tazeh Kand (also Romanized as Tāzeh Kand; also known as Tāzeh Kand-e ‘Eydlū) is a village in Quri Chay-ye Gharbi Rural District, Saraju District, Maragheh County, East Azerbaijan Province, Iran. At the 2006 census, its population was 28, in 7 families.

References 

Towns and villages in Maragheh County